J36 may refer to:

 Allis-Chalmers J36, an American version of the de Havilland Goblin jet engine
 County Route J36 (California)
 Elongated triangular gyrobicupola, a Johnson solid (J36)
 , a Bangor-class minesweeper of the Royal Navy
 LNER Class J36, a British steam locomotive class
 Peritonsillar abscess